The Herald-Dispatch is a daily newspaper that serves Huntington, West Virginia,  and neighboring communities in southern Ohio and eastern Kentucky. It is currently owned by HD Media Co. LLC.

History
The Herald-Dispatch was founded in 1909 when two Huntington newspapers, the Herald and the Dispatch, merged. In 1927, the newspaper became a part of the Huntington Publishing Company, operated by Joseph Harvey Long, the owner of the Huntington Advertiser. The company was operated by the Long family until 1971, when it was sold to the Honolulu Star Bulletin and then to Gannett ten months later. Its companion afternoon paper, the Huntington Advertiser, ceased as a separate publication in 1979. Prior to the Huntington Advertiser's demise, the combined Sunday newspaper was referred to as the Herald-Advertiser, correctly depicted in the movie We Are Marshall. Today, it also publishes the Putnam Herald and the Lawrence Herald, more localized editions of The Herald-Dispatch serving Putnam County, West Virginia and Lawrence County, Ohio, respectively.

For the six-month period ending March 31, 2005, the total average paid circulation was 29,098 for the daily edition and 35,552 for the Sunday edition. On May 8, 2007, the newspaper was sold to Gatehouse Media, then to Champion Industries on June 29.  Then on May 23, 2009, Champion Industries, which owned the paper at that time, revealed that it was in default of a $70 million loan from Fifth Third Bank and the previous owners, and eliminated 24 positions, representing about 15% of its workforce. In October 2011, they laid off additional employees. In 2013, Champion Industries sold The Herald-Dispatch to local politician, Douglas Reynolds, the son of Champion's chief executive.

In 2014, The Herald-Dispatch parent company HD Media acquired the Wayne County News in Wayne, West Virginia. In 2015, the newspaper ceased printing itself, contracting the operation to the Charleston Gazette-Mail and laid off its production staff.  The newspaper is now printed in Charleston and trucked 50 miles to Huntington for distribution.

In 2017, HD Media acquired the Logan Banner, Williamson Daily News, the Coal Valley News in Madison and The Pineville Independent Herald in Pineville from Civitas Media. On March 8, 2018, HD Media, the Herald-Dispatch's holding company, was declared the successful bid in the auction for the Charleston Gazette-Mail after the paper had declared bankruptcy.

Other papers owned by HD Media
Charleston Gazette-Mail
Logan Banner 
Williamson Daily News
Coal Valley News in Madison
The Pineville Independent Herald in Pineville
Wayne County News

See also
 List of newspapers in West Virginia

References

External links 

Newspapers published in West Virginia
Newspapers established in 1909
Huntington, West Virginia
1909 establishments in West Virginia